A nose hook is a pair of small blunt hooks on the end of a strap, sometimes used in BDSM or bondage play. The hooks pull up on the nostrils, giving the user a pig-like appearance which may add to enjoyment via erotic humiliation. The user may also receive pleasure via masochism, as the use of a nose hook may be painful.

A sideways nose hook stretches the nostrils apart and sideways, with a hook on both ends of a strap going around the head.

See also
 List of BDSM equipment

References

BDSM equipment
Physical restraint